American country music singer and songwriter Cole Swindell has released four studio albums, five extended plays, and thirteen singles. He has also released sixteen music videos. All four of Swindell's studio albums have been released through Warner Music Nashville: Cole Swindell in 2014, You Should Be Here in 2016, All of It in 2018, and Stereotype in 2022. His self-titled debut is also his most commercially successful album, having been certified platinum by the Recording Industry Association of America (RIAA).

All of Swindell's singles have charted on the American Billboard Hot Country Songs and Country Airplay charts, with a total of nine having reached the number one position between the two charts. These include his debut single "Chillin' It", along with "Hope You Get Lonely Tonight", "Ain't Worth the Whiskey", "You Should Be Here", "Middle of a Memory", "Love You Too Late", "Single Saturday Night", "Never Say Never", a duet with Lainey Wilson, and "She Had Me at Heads Carolina". All but one of his singles have also charted on the Billboard Hot 100, where "She Had Me at Heads Carolina" holds his highest peak at number 16.

Studio albums

Extended plays

Singles

Other charted songs

Music videos

Notes

References

External links
 Official website
 Cole Swindell at AllMusic

Discographies of American artists
Country music discographies